Musielak is a Polish surname. Notable people with the surname include:

Andreas Musielak, chief operating officer of DENIC, a German domain management cooperative
Dora Musielak, Mexican-American aerospace engineer, historian of mathematics, and book author
Rafał Musielak, player in the winning team of the 2000–01 Polish Volleyball League
Ryszard Musielak (born 1950), Polish labor union leader and anti-communist activist
Sebastian Musielak, Polish translator of Finnish fantasy novel Not Before Sundown
Sławomir Musielak (born 1990), Polish motorcyclist
Stephen Musielak, former pastor at Our Lady of Czestochowa Parish, Boston
Tobiasz Musielak (born 1993), Polish motorcyclist
Walenty Musielak (1913–1977), Polish footballer

Polish-language surnames